John Stephenson (14 May 1937 – 14 October 2014) was an Australian rules footballer who played with Carlton in the Victorian Football League (VFL). 

The son of Jack Stephenson, who also played for Carlton, he was recruited from Benalla, but played only a single league game (in 1958).

In 1989 he was a passenger on United Airlines Flight 811 from Los Angeles to Sydney via Honolulu and Auckland the Boeing 747 Jumbo cargo door failed mid flight and blown 9 people out, Stephenson was seated 11 rows behind where the fuselage was breached. In October 2014, Stephenson was killed when the Van's RV-6 light aircraft he was piloting crashed into a house in the Melbourne suburb of Chelsea.

References

External links 

John Stephenson's profile at Blueseum

1937 births
2014 deaths
Accidental deaths in Victoria (Australia)
Australian rules footballers from Victoria (Australia)
Aviators killed in aviation accidents or incidents in Australia
Carlton Football Club players
Victims of aviation accidents or incidents in 2014
Survivors of aviation accidents or incidents